The 1991 Air Canada Cup was Canada's 13th annual national midget 'AAA' hockey championship, which was played April 23 – 28, 1991 at the Max Bell Centre in Calgary, Alberta.

The gold medal game was an all-Alberta showdown, as the Calgary Northstars defeated the Sherwood Park Chain Gang to become the third host team to win the national midget title.  Shawn Davis scored the game-tying goal for the Northstars and Scott Bradford the game-winner in the Northstars' 2-1 defeat of the Chain Gang. Bradford was the game MVP and Davis was subsequently voted the Northstars' most improved player.

The Lions du Lac St-Louis defeated the Winnipeg Hawks to win the bronze medal.

Future National Hockey League players competing in the 1991 Air Canada Cup were Manny Fernandez, Norm Maracle, Tyson Nash, and Brad Chartrand.

Teams

Round robin

Standings

Scores

Calgary 6 - Hamilton 2
Sherwood Park 3 - Fredericton 2
Lac St-Louis 5 - Winnipeg 3
Calgary 2 - Fredericton 2
Sherwood Park 5 - Hamilton 2
Calgary 6 - Winnipeg 1
Lac St-Louis 3 - Sherwood Park 2
Hamilton 7 - Fredericton 6
Lac St-Louis 2 - Calgary 1
Winnipeg 6 - Sherwood Park 4
Lac St-Louis 3 - Hamilton 2
Fredericton 6 - Winnipeg 0
Calgary 6 - Sherwood Park 3
Winnipeg 7 - Hamilton 2
Lac St-Louis 3 - Fredericton 2

Playoffs

Semi-finals
Sherwood Park 5 - Lac St-Louis 3
Calgary 6 - Winnipeg 3

Bronze-medal game
Lac St-Louis 5 - Winnipeg 2

Gold-medal game
Calgary 2 - Sherwood Park 1

Individual awards
Most Valuable Player: Kane Chaloner (Winnipeg)
Most Sportsmanlike Player: Brad Chartrand (Winnipeg)

See also
Telus Cup

References

External links
Telus Cup Website
Hockey Canada-Telus Cup Guide and Record Book

Telus Cup
Air Canada Cup
Sport in Calgary
April 1991 sports events in Canada